Kay Curley Bennett (1922–1997) was a Navajo artist and writer.

Life 
Bennett was born at Sheepsprings Trading Post in New Mexico and was a Navajo artist, author, and doll maker. Her father was Keddah and a silver smith, and her mother was Mary (Chahiibahi) Chischillie. Bennette studied at Toadllena Boarding School and was later employed as a residentary assistant from 1945 to 1946. Baker was a teacher-interpreter at the Phoenix Indian School from 1945 to 1952 until she decided that she needed a change. In 1958 Bennett moved to Afghanistan and lived there until 1950.

In 1964 Bennette published her autobiography and her first book Kaibah: Recollections of a Navajo Girlhood. This autobiography details her everyday life in New Mexico when she was a girl, specifically from 1928 to 1935 and. Her second book, A Navajo Saga, was written with her husband, Russell Bennett. This novel occurs from 1845 to 1868 and is another family novel. The main character, Shebah, is based on Bennett's grandmother. This novel is also influenced by the story of the Bosque Redondo and the Long Walk back From 1969 to 1972, Bennett acted as New Mexico Human Rights Commissioner, as an advisor of McKinley County Hospital a member of the Inter-Tribal Indian Ceremonial Association and in 1968 she was hand-picked to be New Mexico's Mother of the Year. Bennette's dolls have won prizes at state fairs in Arizona and New Mexico. Bennette's doll making skills were also praised at the Navajo Tribal Fair. Bennett was later appointed staff of the governor of New Mexico and colonel-aid-de-camp. Bennett was an active member of the Inter-Tribal Indian Ceremonial's board of directors from 1974 to 1982, .

Works 

 Kaibah : Recollections of a Navajo Girlhood ( 1964 )
 A Navajo Saga.

References

External links 

 Mixed Messages: Pablita Velarde, Kay Bennett, and the Changing Meaning of Anglo-Indian Intermarriage in Twentieth-Century New Mexico Frontiers: A Journal of Women Studies, Vol. 26, No. 3 (2005), pp. 101–134 (34 pages) University of Nebraska Press

1922 births
1997 deaths
Navajo artists
American artists
20th-century Native Americans